The following is the list of the 40 stations of the Monterrey Metro system (also referred to as Metrorrey) of Monterrey, Nuevo León, Mexico, organized by line.

Line 1 (yellow) Talleres – Exposición

Line 2 (green) Sendero – General I. Zaragoza

Line 3 (orange) Hospital Metropolitano – General I. Zaragoza

References

External links

 Metrorrey – official website

Monterrey

Metro stations, List of Monterrey